Live Phish 07.29.03 was recorded live at the Post-Gazette Pavilion at Star Lake in Burgettstown, Pennsylvania, a suburb of Pittsburgh, on July 29, 2003.

The band told Rolling Stone that they had recently downloaded their entire repertoire on an iPod and purposely decided to play a show of rarities on this summer night in Pittsburgh.

Choices include a very rare performance of the Velvet Underground's "Cool It Down". the only post-hiatus performance of "McGrupp and the Watchful Hosemasters", and the first version of "Harpua" since the 1998 The Dark Side of the Moon breakout, featuring the debut of Jon Fishman singing Elvin Bishop's "Fooled Around and Fell in Love".

Bonus tracks include "Piper" and "Twist" from the Shoreline Amphitheatre in Mountain View, California on July 9, 2003, and a jammed-out version of "Seven Below" from The Gorge in George, Washington, on July 13, 2003.

This show was also among a small batch of the 2003 live shows to be released in CD form.

Track listing

Disc one
 "Daniel Saw the Stone" (Traditional) - 4:02
 "Camel Walk" (Holdsworth) - 5:30
 "Gotta Jibboo" (Anastasio, Lawton, Markellis) - 13:11
 "Cool It Down" (Reed) - 8:33
 "Scent of a Mule" (Gordon) - 10:30
 "Fee" (Anastasio) - 7:50
 "Timber" (White) - 7:45
 "When the Circus Comes" (Hidalgo, Pérez) - 5:11
 "McGrupp and the Watchful Hosemasters" (Anastasio, Marshall) - 9:15
 "Golgi Apparatus" (Anastasio, Marshall, Szuter, Woolf) - 5:02

Disc two
 "Crosseyed and Painless" (Byrne, Eno, Frantz, Harrison, Weymouth) - 4:58
 "Pittsburgh Jam" (Anastasio, Fishman, Gordon, McConnell) - 21:35
 "Thunderhead" (Anastasio, Marshall) - 7:31
 "Brother" (Anastasio, Fishman, Gordon, McConnell) - 7:35
 "Harpua" (Anastasio, Fishman) - 4:11
 "Bittersweet Motel" (Anastasio, Fishman, Gordon, McConnell) - 2:43
 "Harpua" (Anastasio, Fishman) - 1:58
 "Fooled Around and Fell in Love" (Bishop) - 4:17
 "Hold Your Head Up" (Argent, White) - 1:03
 "Harpua" (Anastasio, Fishman) - 6:29
 "David Bowie" (Anastasio) - 14:02

Disc Three
Tracks 2 - 4 are CD-only bonus tracks.  Tracks 2 and 3 were recorded on July 9, 2003 at the Shoreline Amphitheater, Mountain View, CA.   Track 4 was recorded on July 13, 2003 at The Gorge, George, WA.
 "Farmhouse" (Anastasio, Marshall) - 6:58
 "Piper" (Anastasio, Marshall) - 19:08
 "Twist" (Anastasio, Marshall) - 11:34
 "Seven Below" (Anastasio, Marshall) - 21:31

Personnel
Trey Anastasio - guitars, lead vocals, drums on "Fooled Around and Fell in Love" and "Hold Your Head Up"
Page McConnell - piano, organ, backing vocals
Mike Gordon - bass, backing vocals, lead vocals on "Scent of a Mule"
Jon Fishman - drums, backing vocals, lead vocals on "Crosseyed and Painless" and "Fooled Around and Fell in Love"

23
2003.07.29
2003 live albums
Elektra Records live albums